Space Wrangler is the first studio album by the Athens, GA based band Widespread Panic. It was first released by a small Atlanta label, Landslide Records, on February 4, 1988. It was later reissued four times, the first two times by Capricorn Records/Warner Bros. Records, and, in 2001, by Zomba Music Group. Space Wrangler was reissued for the fourth time on vinyl for one day — July 15, 2014 — as a special reissue through Think Indie distribution, that was sold only at independent record stores.

Due to time restraints on the original issue, concert staple "Conrad" was not included in the 1988 release. The reissues featured three extra tracks not found on the original release. "Holden Oversoul" and "Contentment Blues" were both from a John Keane studio session in September 1990. "Me and The Devil Blues / Heaven" was recorded in one take and was taken from "try-out" sessions with Capricorn Records that would result in the Widespread Panic album.

Space Wrangler has been released on vinyl, cassette and CD.

The band played the original Landslide release in its entirety during the first set on December 31, 2008. This show was held at the Pepsi Center in Denver, Colorado.  Nearly two years later, at their annual 'Tunes For Tots' Benefit concert on September 23, 2010, Widespread again used the first set to play through Space Wrangler in its entirety.  However, for this concert, they used the track listing from the re-released Capricorn Records version of the album- adding the four additional songs (three studio tracks) included with the reissues to the setlist.  For the second set of this benefit concert, which took place at the Center Stage Theatre in Atlanta, GA, the band performed the entirety of their self-titled, second studio album.

Track listing

a Produced by Johnny Sandlin
b "Me and the Devil Blues" written by Robert Johnson
c "Heaven" written by David Byrne and Jerry Harrison

Personnel
Widespread Panic
 John Bell – Vocals, Guitar
 Michael Houser – Guitar, Vocals
 Todd Nance – Drums, Percussion, Vocals
 Dave Schools – Bass, Percussion, Vocals

Additional musicians
 Domingo Sunny Ortiz – Percussion
 Tim White – Keyboards
 John Keane – Vocals
 Alberto Salazarte – Rap
 David Blackmon – Fiddle
 Bill Jordan – Laughter
 Page McConnell (and Phish crew) – Organ on "Holden Oversoul"
 T Lavitz – Organ on "Me and the Devil Blues"/"Heaven"
 David Schools, John Keane and John Bell – Background Vocals on "Holden Oversoul"

Production and design
 John Keane – Producer, Engineer
 Benny Quinn – Mastering
 Heather Laurie – 1992 package design
 James Flournoy – Original Package Design/Cover Artwork
 Jeff Corbett – Original Package Logo Design
 Patricia McEachern – Original Package Photography
 Johnny Sandlin – Producer, Remixing (Track 12 only)
 Steve Tillisch – Engineer (Track 12 only)
 Jeff Coppage – Engineer, Remixing (Track 12 only)
 Jim Bickerstaff – Remixing (Track 12 only)

References

External links
Widespread Panic website
Everyday Companion
PanicStream
[ All Music entry]

1988 debut albums
Widespread Panic albums
Albums produced by John Keane (record producer)
Capricorn Records albums
Zomba Group of Companies albums